Fenerbahçe Esports is the esports department of Fenerbahçe. It was established on 14 October 2016 by the Fenerbahçe Association in the district of Levent, Istanbul, Turkey. The department currently has teams competing in Age of Empires II: Definitive Edition, League of Legends, Valorant, FIFA, PlayerUnknown's Battlegrounds, Dota 2 and Apex Legends.

League of Legends

History 

It was founded October 14, 2016, when the 1907 Fenerbahçe Association, chaired by Ali Koç, took over all the rights of the SuperMassive TNG team in the Champions League.

After sweeping SuperMassive 3–0 in the 2019 TCL Winter finals, Fenerbahçe qualified for the 2019 Mid-Season Invitational as Turkey's representative in the play-in stage. The team was placed in Group A of the first round of the 2019 Mid-Season Invitational play-in stage, along with Vietnamese team Phong Vũ Buffalo, Australian team Bombers, and Argentine team Isurus Gaming. Fenerbahçe ended the group round robin with a 4–2 record, tying Phong Vũ Buffalo for 1st and forcing a tiebreaker match, which Fenerbahçe lost.

Honours 
 Turkish Championship League – Summer
 Winners (1): 2017
 Turkish Championship League – Winter
 Winners (2): 2019, 2020
 Rift Rivals
 Winner (1): 2017

Roster

References

External links 
 
 Official website of 1907 Fenerbahçe Association

Fenerbahçe S.K.
2016 establishments in Turkey
Esports teams based in Turkey
Counter-Strike teams
Dota teams
Turkish Championship League teams
FIFA (video game series) teams